Aberdeen, previously known as , is a 2014 Hong Kong drama film written and directed by Pang Ho-cheung and starring Louis Koo, Eric Tsang, Miriam Yeung and Gigi Leung . Pang revealed in various interviews that the film differed from his previous comedies Vulgaria and SDU, in that it explores the family dynamics in a typical Hong Kong family. The film was released on 8 May 2014.

Cast 

 Louis Koo as Cheng Wai-tao
 Eric Tsang as Cheng Yau-Kin cheung
 Miriam Yeung as Cheng Wai-ching
 Gigi Leung as Cici Cheng
 Ng Man-tat as Dong Cheng
 Carrie Ng as Ta
 Chapman To
 Shawn Yue as Dan
 Dada Chan as Van
 Jacky Choi
 Derek Tsang
 Yumiko Cheng
 Pal Sinn
 Lawrence Chou
 Derek Kwok
 Matt Chow
 Lee Man-kwai as Chloe "Piggy" Cheng
 Angelina Lo
 Chan Fai-Hung
 Brenda Lam
 Ryan Lau

Reception
As of 11 May 2014, the film has grossed ¥9.6 million in China and HK$4.57 million in Hong Kong. It was listed among "Hong Kong's 5 Most Essential Films of 2014" in The Wall Street Journal's "China RealTime" blog.

References

External links 
 mtime.com
 m1905.com
 
 

2014 films
Films directed by Pang Ho-cheung
2014 drama films
Hong Kong drama films
2010s Cantonese-language films
2010s Hong Kong films